KKMV (106.1 FM) is a radio station broadcasting a country format. Licensed to Rupert, Idaho, United States, the station serves the Twin Falls (Sun Valley) area.  The station is currently owned by Lee Family Broadcasting, Inc.

References

External links

KMV
Country radio stations in the United States